Shamsiddin Shohin District (Nohiyai Shamsiddin Shohin, before 2016 Shuroobod District ), is a district in Khatlon Region, southeastern Tajikistan. Its capital is the village Shuroobod.

Shuroobod District was renamed Shamsiddin Shohin in memory of this Tajik poet.

Administrative divisions

They are as follows:

Geography
Shamsiddin Shohin District is bordered in the north by Darvoz District and Khovaling District, in the west by Mu'minobod District and Hamadoni District, all in Khatlon Region. In the east and south, across the river Panj, it borders Afghanistan. It is located in the foothills of the Hazrati Shoh mountains.

References

Districts of Khatlon Region
Districts of Tajikistan